Maciej Kuciapa (born 23 November 1975 in Ropczyce, Poland) is a former motorcycle speedway rider from Poland.

Honours 
 Individual European Championship:
 2007 - in Qualifying Round 3 was replaced by Marat Gatiatov
 European Club Champions' Cup:
 2006 -  Tarnów - bronze medal (5 pts) with Simon&Wolf Debrecen
 2008 -  Slaný - Silver medal (7 pts)
 2009 -  Toruń 4th place (6 pts) for Simon & Wolf Debrecen
 Individual Polish Championship:
 2004 - 7th place
 Individual U-21 Polish Championship:
 1994 - 7th place
 Polish Pairs Championship
 2005 - Polish Champion
 Team Polish Championship:
 1998 - bronze medal
 Team U-21 Polish Championship:
 1994 - Polish Champion
 1995 - Polish Champion
 1996 - silver medal
 Golden Helmet:
 2004 - 5th place
 Silver Helmet U-21:
 1993 - 6th place

See also 
 Poland national speedway team
 Speedway in Poland

References 

1975 births
Living people
Polish speedway riders
People from Ropczyce-Sędziszów County
Sportspeople from Podkarpackie Voivodeship